The Malagos Garden Resort is an agri-ecotourism site in Davao City, Philippines.

History
The Malagos Garden Resort is owned by the Puentespina family which would introduce chocolate making in Davao City in 2012 through Malagos Chocolate.

The first chocolate museum in the Philippines was opened within the resort in November 2016.

In June 2018, the Malagos Chocolate Spa opened within the resort, which uses cacao husks, a byproduct of chocolate making, produced by the garden resort. 

The garden resort stopped admitting tourists in mid-March 2020 due to the onset of the COVID-19 pandemic. The facility's farming operations continued.

Facilities and attractions

It is accredited as a farm tourism site by the government's Department of Tourism. It is known for its Chocolate Museum, orchid farm, and chocolate spa. It also hosts a bird feeding dome, butterfly sanctuary and museum, a playground, a skate park, and a moonlight theater. A long-time attraction is the Malagos Bird Show which was hosted by Bo Puentespina which was held on weekends from the early 2000s to 2019. It operates a  cacao farm.

References

Farm stay
Tourist attractions in Davao City
Farms in the Philippines
Zoos in the Philippines